The  is the period in Japanese history in which civil wars and social upheavals took place almost continuously in the 15th and 16th centuries. Though the Ōnin War (1467) is generally chosen as the Sengoku period's start date, there are many competing historiographies for its end date, ranging from 1568, the date of Oda Nobunaga's march on Kyoto, to the suppression of the Shimabara Rebellion in 1638, deep into what is traditionally considered the Edo period. Regardless of the dates chosen, the Sengoku period overlaps substantially with the Muromachi period (1336–1573).

The Sengoku period was initiated by the Ōnin War in 1467 which collapsed the feudal system of Japan under the Ashikaga shogunate. Various samurai warlords and clans fought for control of Japan in the power vacuum, while the  emerged to fight against samurai rule. The arrival of Europeans in 1543 introduced the arquebus into Japanese warfare. Japan ended its mission to the Ming China in 1547, which had been carried out 19 times since 1401 due to the need for trade. Oda Nobunaga dissolved the Ashikaga shogunate in 1573 and launched a war of political unification by force, including the Ishiyama Hongan-ji War, until his death in the Honnō-ji Incident in 1582. Nobunaga's successor Toyotomi Hideyoshi completed his campaign to unify Japan and consolidated his rule with numerous influential reforms. Hideyoshi launched the Japanese invasions of Korea in 1592, but their eventual failure damaged his prestige before his death in 1598. Tokugawa Ieyasu displaced Hideyoshi's young son and successor Toyotomi Hideyori at the Battle of Sekigahara in 1600 and re-established the feudal system under the Tokugawa shogunate. 

The Sengoku period was named by Japanese historians after the similar but otherwise unrelated Warring States period of China. Modern Japan recognizes Oda Nobunaga, Toyotomi Hideyoshi, and Tokugawa Ieyasu as the three "Great Unifiers" for their restoration of central government in the country.

Summary 

During this period, although the Emperor of Japan was officially the ruler of his nation and every lord swore loyalty to him, he was largely a marginalized, ceremonial, and religious figure who delegated power to the shōgun, a noble who was roughly equivalent to a general. In the years preceding this era, the shogunate gradually lost influence and control over the daimyōs (local lords). Although the Ashikaga shogunate had retained the structure of the Kamakura shogunate and instituted a warrior government based on the same socio-economic rights and obligations established by the Hōjō with the Jōei Code in 1232, it failed to win the loyalty of many daimyō, especially those whose domains were far from the capital, Kyoto. Many of these lords began to fight uncontrollably with each other for control over land and influence over the shogunate. As trade with Ming China grew, the economy developed, and the use of money became widespread as markets and commercial cities appeared. Combined with developments in agriculture and small-scale trading, this led to the desire for greater local autonomy throughout all levels of the social hierarchy. As early as the beginning of the 15th century, the suffering caused by earthquakes and famines often served to trigger armed uprisings by farmers weary of debt and taxes.

The Ōnin War (1467–1477), a conflict rooted in economic distress and brought on by a dispute over shogunal succession, is generally regarded as the onset of the Sengoku period. The "eastern" army of the Hosokawa family and its allies clashed with the "western" army of the Yamana. Fighting in and around Kyoto lasted for nearly 11 years, leaving the city almost completely destroyed. The conflict in Kyoto then spread to outlying provinces.

The period culminated with a series of three warlords Oda Nobunaga, Toyotomi Hideyoshi, and Tokugawa Ieyasu who gradually unified Japan. After Tokugawa Ieyasu's final victory at the siege of Osaka in 1615, Japan settled down into over 200 years of peace under the Tokugawa shogunate.

Timeline 

The Ōnin War in 1467 is usually considered the starting point of the Sengoku period. There are several events which could be considered the end of it: Nobunaga's entry to Kyoto (1568) or abolition of the Muromachi shogunate (1573), the siege of Odawara (1590), the Battle of Sekigahara (1600), the establishment of the Tokugawa shogunate (1603), or the siege of Osaka (1615).

Gekokujō

The upheaval resulted in the further weakening of central authority, and throughout Japan, regional lords, called daimyōs, rose to fill the vacuum. In the course of this power shift, well-established clans such as the Takeda and the Imagawa, who had ruled under the authority of both the Kamakura and Muromachi bakufu, were able to expand their spheres of influence. There were many, however, whose positions eroded and were eventually usurped by more capable underlings.

One of the earliest instances of this was Hōjō Sōun, who rose from relatively humble origins and eventually seized power in Izu Province in 1493. Building on the accomplishments of Sōun, the Hōjō clan remained a major power in the Kantō region until its subjugation by Toyotomi Hideyoshi late in the Sengoku period. Other notable examples include the supplanting of the Hosokawa clan by the Miyoshi, the Toki by the Saitō, and the Shiba clan by the Oda clan, which was in turn replaced by its underling, Toyotomi Hideyoshi, a son of a peasant with no family name.

Well-organized religious groups also gained political power at this time by uniting farmers in resistance and rebellion against the rule of the daimyōs. The monks of the Buddhist True Pure Land sect formed numerous Ikkō-ikki, the most successful of which, in Kaga Province, remained independent for nearly 100 years.

Unification

After nearly a century of political instability and warfare, Japan was on the verge of unification by Oda Nobunaga, who had emerged from obscurity in the province of Owari (present-day Aichi Prefecture) to dominate central Japan. In 1582, while in Kyoto at the temple of Honnō-ji, Oda Nobunaga committed seppuku during an invasion of the temple led by one of his generals, Akechi Mitsuhide, in order to assassinate Oda. This allowed Toyotomi Hideyoshi the opportunity to establish himself as Oda's successor after rising through the ranks from ashigaru (footsoldier) to become one of Oda's most trusted generals. Toyotomi eventually consolidated his control over the remaining daimyōs but ruled as Kampaku (Imperial Regent) as his common birth excluded him from the title of Sei-i Taishōgun. During his short reign as Kampaku, Toyotomi attempted two invasions of Korea. The first attempt, spanning from 1592 to 1596, was initially successful but suffered setbacks from the Joseon Navy and ended in a stalemate. The second attempt began in 1597 but was less successful as the Koreans, especially their navy, led by Admiral Yi Sun-Sin, were prepared from their first encounter. In 1598, Toyotomi called for retreat from Korea prior to his death.

Without leaving a capable successor, the country was once again thrust into political turmoil, and Tokugawa Ieyasu took advantage of the opportunity.

On his deathbed, Toyotomi appointed a group of the most powerful lords in Japan—Tokugawa, Maeda Toshiie, Ukita Hideie, Uesugi Kagekatsu, and Mōri Terumoto—to govern as the Council of Five Regents until his infant son, Hideyori, came of age. An uneasy peace lasted until the death of Maeda in 1599. Thereafter a number of high-ranking figures, notably Ishida Mitsunari, accused Tokugawa of disloyalty to the Toyotomi regime.

This precipitated a crisis that led to the Battle of Sekigahara in 1600, during which Tokugawa and his allies, who controlled the east of the country, defeated the anti-Tokugawa forces, which had control of the west. Generally regarded as the last major conflict of the Sengoku period, Tokugawa's victory at Sekigahara effectively marked the end of the Toyotomi regime, the last remnants of which were finally destroyed in the siege of Osaka in 1615.

Notable people

Three unifiers of Japan 

Oda Nobunaga 
Toyotomi Hideyoshi
Tokugawa Ieyasu

See also
 List of daimyōs from the Sengoku period
 List of Japanese battles
 Horses in East Asian warfare
 Warring States period – a similar period in Chinese history 
 Crisis of the Third Century – a similar period in Roman history
 Kabukimono

Notes

References

 

 Jansen, Marius B. (2000). The Making of Modern Japan. Cambridge: Harvard University Press. /. .

External links
 Warring-States Japan Battle Dataset – 2,889 battles occurring within Japan during the Sengoku period
 Sengoku Period - World History Encyclopedia
 Samurai Archives Japanese History page
  Sengoku Expo: Japanese Design, Culture in the Age of Civil Wars held in Gifu Prefecture, 2000–2001
  List of the Sengoku Daimyos

 
Muromachi period

1460s establishments in Japan
1467 establishments in Asia
1573 disestablishments in Japan
Wars of succession involving the states and peoples of Asia